Peters Mountain [el. ] is a ridge in Dauphin County, Pennsylvania. The ridge contains a scenic overlook.

Peters Mountain was named for Peter Allen, a pioneer settler.

References

Landforms of Dauphin County, Pennsylvania
Mountains of Pennsylvania